St Peter's Boys School was a Roman Catholic school in Stewartville Street, Partick, Scotland.  It is no longer a school, having merged with Notre Dame Primary School in 2013. The building has been converted into a block of flats and the old playgrounds are residents' car parks.

Notable pupils
Billy Connolly
Armando Iannucci

Less well known was Helen Puttock (Bible Johns third victim) - source Bible John Bbc podcast episode 5 - https://www.bbc.co.uk/programmes/p0d3f8jl/episodes/downloads

References

Defunct boys' schools in Scotland
Defunct schools in Glasgow
Defunct Catholic schools in Scotland